Corpsing is 2000 novel by Toby Litt.

Plot summary
Conrad is a television producer who, whilst having lunch with his ex-girlfriend Lily, witnesses her murder and is shot himself by an anonymous assailant.  The rest of the novel centres on Conrad's attempts to uncover the identity of Lily's killer and to discover the reasons for her murder.

External links
Corpsing at Toby Litt's homepage.
 

2000 novels
Hamish Hamilton books